Polycystin 1 like 1, transient receptor potential channel interacting is a protein that in humans is encoded by the PKD1L1 gene.

Function

This gene encodes a member of the polycystin protein family containing 11 transmembrane domains, a receptor for egg jelly (REJ) domain, and a polycystin-1, lipoxygenase, alpha-toxin (PLAT) domain. The encoded protein may play a role in the male reproductive system. Alternative splice variants have been described but their biological nature has not been determined. [provided by RefSeq, Jul 2008].

References

Further reading